Charles Clore Park (Park Charles Clore) is a beachfront park in southwestern Tel Aviv, Israel. Covering  of public land along the Mediterranean Sea, it's named after Charles Clore, a British financier, property magnate and philanthropist. The Charles Clore Foundation remains an influential grant and funding organization that supports non-profits based in Israel.

The park opened to the public in 1974. In 2007, it underwent a two-year makeover.

It was built from the remains of Manshiya, a historic Palestinian neighborhood that was expelled in 1948, and whose buildings were demolished in the 1960s as part of a project to establish there a new central business district (CBD). The remains of the buildings, dumped into the seashore, could not be disposed of properly due to municipal budget constraints, and were embanked as reclaimed land.

Events
Each June, the annual Tel Aviv Pride Parade concludes at the park with a large party.

In May 2019, Tel Aviv hosted the Eurovision Song Contest 2019 and built the "Euro Village" in the park. The Euro Village hosted over 20,000 delegates, media professionals and tourists for nine days. It consisted of seven areas with music shows from famous Israeli performers, DJs, sports centers, yoga, an Israeli food court, and official souvenir stalls.

This year, on June 25, 2021, the park filled amid the Covid-19 pandemic with people from all over the country; this being the largest gathering in the country since the beginning of the pandemic.

References

External links
 

Urban public parks
Parks in Tel Aviv